Mian Rah-e Jaber (also Romanized as Mīān Rāh-e Jāber; also known as Jāber and Mīānrāh) is a village in Dustan Rural District, Badreh District, Darreh Shahr County, Ilam Province, Iran. At the 2006 census, its population was 112, in 24 families. The village is populated by Kurds.

References 

Populated places in Darreh Shahr County
Kurdish settlements in Ilam Province